Ian Shaw,  (born 1961) is a British academic and Egyptologist, who was formerly Reader in Egyptian Archaeology at the University of Liverpool.

Life
His field work was largely focused in el-Amarna, but in recent times, he has done extensive excavations of mining and quarrying sites from various Ancient Egyptian periods. He primarily focuses his recent work on methods and mechanics of Egyptian craftsmen and laborers. However, he has produced several works regarding ancient Egyptian warfare; a topic that had long been ignored or only briefly commented on by other researchers.

Besides writing original books, he also has edited several "dictionaries" of Ancient Egypt (which might more correctly be labeled "encyclopedias"; they are in no way lexicons).

On 15 March 2018, Shaw was elected a Fellow of the Society of Antiquaries (FSA).

Bibliography
Egyptian Warfare and Weapons, 1991
A History of Ancient Egypt, 1992 (Translated from French work by Nicholas Grimal)
The British Museum Dictionary of Ancient Egypt, 1995 (With P. Nicholson)
The Blackwell Dictionary of Archaeology (co-Editor, with R. Jameson), 1999
The Oxford History of Ancient Egypt, 2000 (Editor)
Ancient Egyptian Materials and Technology, 2000 (Editor)
Ancient Egypt: A Very Short Introduction, 2nd edition 2021
Hatnub: Quarrying Travertine in Ancient Egypt (2010)
Ancient Egyptian Technology and Innovation (2012)
Ancient Egyptian Warfare (2019)
''The Oxford Handbook of Egyptology", 2020 (Editor)

See also
List of Egyptologists

References

External links
Dr. Ian Shaw
Crafty Way to Unlock History

English Egyptologists
1961 births
Living people
Fellows of the Society of Antiquaries of London